Adena was a town in Morgan County, in the U.S. state of Colorado. The GNIS classifies it as a populated place.

History
A post office called Adena was established in 1910, and remained in operation until 1949. The community has the name of Edna Adena, a local resident.

References

Ghost towns in Colorado
Geography of Morgan County, Colorado